In Oceania, Google Street View is available in most parts of Australia and New Zealand.

On 4 August 2008, the long-anticipated image collection of Australia was introduced. At this time, 18 camera icons were added. Extensive mapping of New Zealand was included on 1 December 2008. On 9 December 2008, Darwin, Australia, and other locations were included.
On 30 October 2009, Google Australia announced that they would be sending its fleet of cars back on the road from November 2009 to update Street View Australia with new images.

In October 2010, Google Street View ceased operations in Australia after its Street View cars were found to have been  collecting Wi-Fi data from home Wi-Fi networks. In May 2011, Google Australia stated that they had removed all the Wi-Fi sniffing equipment and that they planned to shoot Australian roads again, but did not provide a specific timetable. On 27 July 2011, major urban and regional centres of Australia were updated with the new HD imagery.

In February 2015 another update of Australia with HD imagery was released, as part of the first update in Northern Territory after the low-resolution imagery. It also affected parts of Western Australia and Queensland. However, some places still have only low-resolution imagery or don't even have Street View coverage at all. As of June 2015, the updates of Australia footage are ongoing.

Timeline of introductions

Areas included
The following areas are included.

Most towns, cities, villages, major and rural roads.

Easter Island - Some streets and roads.

Galapagos Islands - Some paths and some beach walks.

The ring road. Streets in Suva and Nadi.

Bora-Bora, Huahine, Moorea, Papeete, Raiatea and more islands – roads
Bora-Bora – boat views

Underwater view near Nouméa

Mountain climbing at the Puncak Jaya mountain
For other parts of Indonesia, see Google Street View in Asia.

Bonin Islands
Chichi-jima – Most roads
Haha-jima – Most roads
For other parts of Japan, see Google Street View in Asia.

Most towns, cities, villages, major and sealed rural roads, and seven of the nine Great Walks hiking tracks.

Pitcairn Island – Most roads and some paths
Henderson Island – Some beach walks

Midway Atoll

,
For more details, see Google Street View in the United States.

Southeast Volcano Trek in Ambrym
underwater views such as Tongoa Walls, Million Dollar Point and SS President Coolidge wreck in Vanuatu

Countries without any coverage 
Countries of Oceania which do not have coverage: 

,
,
,
,
,
,
,
,
,

All these countries have photospheres, 360 degree panorama photos similar to the streetview photos, accessible in Google maps.

Competing products
New Zealand: EveryScape provides coverage for Christchurch.

References

Oceania
Communications in Oceania
Geography of Oceania
Maps of Oceania